Gust Lamesch (born 23 June 1911, date of death unknown) was a Luxembourgian fencer. He competed in the individual foil and team épée events at the 1948 Summer Olympics.

References

External links
 

1911 births
Year of death missing
Luxembourgian male épée fencers
Luxembourgian male foil fencers
Olympic fencers of Luxembourg
Fencers at the 1948 Summer Olympics